Brindaban Das is a Bangladeshi playwright, actor, writer and director. He won the best dramatist award from Bangladesh Cine-Journalist Association and Bangladesh Cultural Reporters Association. He was again nominated as the best dramatist by the Cultural Reporters Association of Bangladesh. He wrote about two hundred plays and sequels including Harkipte, Sakin Sarisuri, Ghar Kutum, Patri Chai, Tin Geda, Service Holder, Gharkutum, Mohor Sheikh, Jamai Mela.

Early life and education
He was born in Sanrora village of Chatmohar Upazila in Pabna District. His father Dayala Krishna Das was a renowned kirtanist, well versed in padavali kirtans and literature. His mother Mayna Rani passed away in 2018 at the age of 75 due to a heart attack. Brindaban Das completed his primary education from Shalikha Government Primary School. He passed SSC from Chatmohar RCN and BSN High School and HSC from Chatmohar Government Degree College. Later he obtained BSS and MSS degree in Political Science from Jagannath College (now Jagannath University) under Dhaka University.

Career
In 1981, Das left his home to join Abahani Club in Dhaka to become a famous football player. He told the legendary footballer Amalesh Sen about his feelings but failed and returned to the hometown. For three consecutive years from 1984, he was awarded green medal as the best footballer of his Upazila.

He started his acting career in 1985. His debut drama was Chor at Chatmohar Cultural Council. Although his role in his first drama was insignificant. Later, he joined Mamunur Rashid's Aranyak Natyadal. In 1997, he left Aranyak Natyadal and formed Pracchyanatya and wrote the play called Kadte Mana. Surer Alo is his short stories collection that contains four of his stories.

In 1994, he worked as a junior officer at the head office of Delta Life Insurance Company for some time. Until 2006, he worked in the international development organization Care Bangladesh. He was Election Commissioner in Television Program Producers Association of Bangladesh along with Masum Aziz and Naresh Bhuiyan.

However, Brindaban began his acting career in the early 1990s. Later he became a senior Bangladeshi actor. He has acted with leading Bangladeshi actors including Chanchal Chowdhury, Mosharraf Karim and Zahid Hasan.

Personal life
Das married actress Shahnaz Khushi on January 19, 1994 after dating for eight years. Now they have two sons named Dibya Jyoti and Soumya Jyoti. Their twin sons are actors by profession who act in tv dramas and films.

Works 
Notable plays written by Brindaban Das include:

 Kadte Mana (1997; stage play)
 Dorir Khela (stage play)
 Oronno Songbad (stage play)
 Konna (stage play)
 Bondhuboreshu (1999; First drama on TV by Brindaban)
 Ghor-Kutum
 Onishchit Jatra (directed by Mamunur Rashid)
 Alta Sundori
 Manik Chor
 Biyer Phul
 Rosu Chor
 Pal Bari
 Shil Bari
 Goru Chor
 O Pakhi Tor Jontrona
 Pita Bonam Putro Gong
 Tritiyo Purush
 Piliyar
 Waren
 Talk Show
 Jamai Mela
 Harkipte
 Mohor Sheikh
 Sakin Sarisuri
 Choita Pagol
 Shonda Panda

Television
 Harkipte
 Service Holder (2016)
 Shil Bari (2020)
 Pal Bari (2022)
 Mohor Sheikh
 Bibek Mojid
 Alamot
 Ar Matro Koyda Din
 Tritiyo Purush
 Jamai Daoyat
 Membor
 Gun Mojid

Filmography

Awards and nominations 
Bachsas Awards

Television Reporters Association of Bangladesh Award

RTV Star Award

References

External links
 

1962 births
Living people
Bangladeshi male film actors
Bangladeshi male television actors
Bangladeshi male stage actors
Bengali actors
21st-century Bangladeshi male actors
Bangladeshi dramatists and playwrights
Bengali Hindus
Bangladeshi Hindus
People from Pabna District
Jagannath University alumni